Post Danmark A/S is the national provider of postal services in Denmark. It was established as a fully state-owned stock holder's company in 1995 following political liberalization efforts. Post Danmark had taken over the mail delivery concession of its predecessor, the governmental department Postvæsenet, which was established in 1624. Post Danmark A/S was turned into a public limited company in 2002. In 2005, 22% of the company shares were sold to CVC Capital Partners, 3.5% of the company shares were partly sold to employees at a discount, partly kept in reserve for a management incentives program. In 2009, it was merged with the Swedish Posten AB to form PostNord, a joint postal service company between Denmark and Sweden.

As of 2007, Post Danmark employed about 21,000 people, and delivered approximately a billion letters and 37 million parcels every year. Post Danmark has a wide variety of services, such as express deliveries (ensured delivery by no later than 9 am the following morning), courier services, facility services, 10 o'clock service (ensured delivery no later than 10 am every day), Electronic mailbox (mail getting scanned electronically and sent to you by email instead of regular post).

Merger with Posten AB
On 1 April 2008 Post Danmark announced its intention to merge with its Swedish counterpart, Posten AB, to realise greater economies of scale and postal synergies. The combined company post-merger had an annual revenue of approximately 45 billion Swedish crowns and employed more than 50,000 people. Immediately following the merger the combined company was 18% owned by the Danish state and the company's employees, 60% by the Swedish state, and 22% by the private equity house CVC Capital Partners. At that time it was expected that the company would be listed on the stock exchanges of both Copenhagen and Stockholm within 3–5 years, but as of 2019 this had yet to happen. The merger completed on 24 June 2009. Post Danmark merged with Posten AB to form the new holding company Posten Norden AB, currently known as PostNord. Posten Norden AB has since been renamed PostNord AB.

On 2 February 2009, in advance of the merger, it was announced that CVC had entered into an agreement with the Government of Denmark to sell its stake in Post Danmark in exchange for Post Danmark's 49.9 stake in La Poste/De Post (the then name for Bpost), the state postal service of the Belgium, in a transaction valued at 473 million euros. CVC had originally acquired its stake in Post Danmark in 2005 during the latter's partial privatisation.

See also
 Postal codes in Denmark
 Postage stamps and postal history of Denmark
 Postverk Føroya – Faroese postal service (run by Denmark until 1976)
 Post Greenland – Greenlandic postal service (formerly run by Denmark)

Notes

References

External links
 Official website - Post Danmark A/S is part of the PostNord Group.
 Details from the CVR register

Service companies of Denmark
Denmark
Private equity portfolio companies
CVC Capital Partners companies
Philately of Denmark
Danish companies established in 1995
Postal system of Denmark